The western mourning skink (Lissolepis luctuosa) is a species of skink, a lizard in the family Scincidae. It is also called the western glossy swamp skink.

The species is endemic to Australia and is found in the state of Western Australia.

References

Skinks of Australia
Endemic fauna of Australia
Taxa named by Wilhelm Peters
Reptiles described in 1866
Lissolepis